Aztec Butte is a sandstone summit, elevation , located in the Island in the Sky District of Canyonlands National Park, in San Juan County, Utah. Aztec Butte is composed of white cross-bedded Navajo Sandstone, which is the remains of wind-borne sand dunes deposited approximately 170 million years ago during the Jurassic Period. It resembles the Pyramid of the Sun in Mexico, which was built by the Aztecs.

Ancestral Puebloan people traveled to the Island in the Sky area to hunt and gather seeds, then stored their food in stone granaries near the top of Aztec Butte. These well-preserved granaries date to AD 1200–1300. A half-mile hiking trail through flat grassland, followed by a quarter-mile scramble with 200 feet vertical gain, leads to the top of the butte and the granaries. The trailhead is located alongside the road to Upheaval Dome. Precipitation runoff from Aztec Butte drains to the Green River.

Gallery

Climate
Spring and fall are the most favorable seasons to visit Aztec Butte. According to the Köppen climate classification system, it is located in a Cold semi-arid climate zone, which is defined by the coldest month having an average mean temperature below −0 °C (32 °F) and at least 50% of the total annual precipitation being received during the spring and summer.

See also
 Colorado Plateau
 Geology of the Canyonlands area

References

External links

 Canyonlands National Park National Park Service
 Aztec Butte: weather forecast

Landforms of San Juan County, Utah
Colorado Plateau
Canyonlands National Park
Sandstone formations of the United States
Buttes of Utah
Rock formations of Utah
North American 1000 m summits